HBO Max is an American subscription video on-demand over-the-top streaming service which is the property of parent subsidiary WarnerMedia Direct, LLC, a unit owned by Warner Bros. Discovery Global Streaming & Interactive Entertainment, a division of Warner Bros. Discovery (WBD). Launched in the United States on May 27, 2020, the service is built around the libraries of HBO, Warner Bros., Cartoon Network, Adult Swim, and their related brands. The service also carries first-run programming from the HBO pay television service, original programming under the "Max Originals" banner, and content acquired via third-party library deals (such as those with film studios for pay television rights) and co-production agreements (such as those with BBC Studios and Sesame Workshop among others).

The service succeeds both HBO Now—a previous HBO SVOD service, and HBO Go—the on-demand streaming platform for HBO pay television subscribers. In the U.S., HBO Now subscribers and HBO pay television subscribers were migrated to HBO Max at no additional charge, subject to availability and device support. HBO Max also supplanted the streaming component of DC Entertainment's DC Universe service, with its original series being migrated to HBO Max as Max Originals. The HBO Max service began to expand into international markets in 2021.

According to AT&T, HBO and HBO Max had a combined total of 69.4 million paying subscribers globally on June 30, 2021, including 43.5 million HBO Max subscribers in the U.S., 3.5 million HBO-only U.S. subscribers (primarily commercial customers like hotels), and 20.5 million subscribers to either HBO Max or HBO by itself in other countries. By the end of 2021, HBO and HBO Max had a combined total of 73.8 million paying global subscribers. At the end of Q1 2022, HBO and HBO Max had 76.8 million global subscribers.

Since the April 2022 merger of WarnerMedia with Discovery, Inc. to form Warner Bros. Discovery, HBO Max is one of the combined company's two flagship streaming services, the other being Discovery+ (which primarily focuses on factual programming from the Discovery brands). A relaunch of the service incorporating Discovery content is expected to be unveiled on April 12, 2023; while WBD originally intended the relaunched service to subsume and replace Discovery+, CEO David Zaslav later revealed that the company no longer planned to do so.

History

Establishment and launch 
On October 10, 2018, WarnerMedia announced that it would launch an over-the-top streaming service in late 2019, featuring content from its entertainment brands. The original plan for the service called for three tiers with a late 2019 launch. Randall L. Stephenson, chairman and CEO of WarnerMedia's parent, AT&T indicated in mid-May 2019 that it would use the HBO brand and would tie into cable operators as HBO cable subscribers would have access to the streaming service. A beta was expected in the fourth quarter of 2019 and a full launch in the first quarter of 2020 at the time.

Otter Media was transferred in May 2019 to WarnerMedia Entertainment from Warner Bros. to take over the streaming service as Brad Bentley, executive vice president, and general manager of the direct-to-consumer development exited the post after six months. Andy Forssell transferred from being the chief operating officer of Otter to replace Bentley as executive vice president and general manager while still reporting to Otter CEO Tony Goncalves, who would lead development.

On July 9, 2019, WarnerMedia announced that the service would be known as HBO Max, and would launch in spring 2020, while Reese Witherspoon's Hello Sunshine and Greg Berlanti were signed to production deals for the service. (The "Max" moniker is shared with HBO's sister linear pay television service Cinemax, which has alternately identified by its suffix name since the mid-1980s and used it prominently in its branding from 2008 to 2011.) On October 29, 2019, it was announced that HBO Max would officially launch in May 2020.

On January 8, 2020, AT&T announced that Audience, a channel exclusive to subscribers of AT&T-owned television providers such as DirecTV with some original programming, would be sunset on May 22, eventually transitioning to a barker channel for HBO Max. Warner Bros. and HBO Max announced the Warner Max film label on February 5, 2020, which would produce eight to ten mid-budget movies per year for the streaming service starting in 2020. On April 20, 2020, WarnerMedia announced HBO Max's launch date as May 27. Later that year on October 23, it was announced that WarnerMedia decided to consolidate the Warner Max label into the Warner Bros. Pictures Group after its chairman Toby Emmerich, and his development and production team led by Courtenay Valenti of Warner Bros. Pictures, Richard Brener of New Line and Walter Hamada, who oversees DC-based films, 
was put to manage the company's entire film output, both theatrical and streaming releases.

Warner Bros. Discovery era 
On March 14, 2022, after Discovery, Inc. shareholders approved its merger with a divestiture of WarnerMedia by AT&T to form Warner Bros. Discovery, Discovery CFO Gunnar Wiedenfels stated that the company planned to pursue an eventual merger of HBO Max with its own streaming service Discovery+. Wiedenfels stated that this process would most likely begin with a bundle of the two services as a short-term option, with a long-term goal to eventually merge the services into one platform. President and CEO of Discovery Streaming and International JB Perrette first identified this as a possibility in November 2021, stating that the company could pursue such a unified service in markets where Discovery+ has yet to launch, such as other parts of Asia-Pacific.

In July 2022, as a part of a post-merger money-saving and strategic move, it was reported that HBO Max had ceased new original series development in Central Europe, Nordic Europe, the Netherlands, and Turkey, as well as removed selected international series from the platform worldwide. It was reported that France and Spain had been largely excluded from these cuts, due to French regulations requiring streaming services to produce domestic content, and Spanish-language content appealing to a wide range of markets served by HBO Max. With the cancellation of Gordita Chronicles later that month, it was reported that the service was also abandoning development of live-action children's and family programming.

On August 3, 2022, it was reported that multiple Max Original films and HBO series had been quietly removed from the service without prior notice, as part of cuts to direct-to-streaming films, as well as to write-off films and series that have underperformed as tax losses. It was also thought that avoiding payment for residuals played a part. This followed news that had broken the previous day that then-upcoming Max Original films Batgirl and Scoob! Holiday Haunt had been both abruptly cancelled, despite being nearly complete.

During an earnings call the next day, WBD CEO David Zaslav stated that the company would cut children's programming, and emphasize theatrical films over direct-to-streaming releases. Perrette also revealed that Discovery+ and HBO Max would merge "next Summer", with the unified service launching first in the United States, and rolled out to other markets beginning in late-2023. Later that month, more programs were removed from the streaming service, including animated and unscripted series such as The Not-Too-Late Show with Elmo, Final Space, Summer Camp Island, Infinity Train and Close Enough, which was met with heavy backlash from fans, critics, actors, and creators alike. On August 24, 2022, the HBO Max original films House Party (which was pulled from its slate just 17 days before its release) and Evil Dead Rise were both shifted to theatrical releases. WBD later reached licensing deals with the free ad-supported streaming television (FAST) providers Roku and Tubi in 2023; the deal covers over 2,000 hours of library programming, some of which being shows that had been pulled from HBO Max.

In November 2022 during its third-quarter earnings report, WBD stated that the merged service was now targeting a "Spring 2023" launch in the U.S., ahead of the original schedule. Perrette also stated of a potential price increase for HBO Max's ad-free tier in 2023, explaining that it was "an opportunity, particularly in this environment". A price hike for the ad-free tier in the U.S. was later announced on January 12, 2023, which saw the price raised by $1 to $15.99 a month (the yearly plan would be unaffected by this move), effective immediately for new subscribers, while current subscribers would see the price hike starting on February 11, 2023.

When announcing the merged service, Zaslav did not immediately indicate whether it would continue to carry the HBO brand; he stated that HBO was one of the "great crown jewels of the company", and would "always be the beacon and the ultimate brand that stands for the best of television quality". In early-December 2022, it was reported by CNBC via inside sources that the unified platform was being developed under the codename "BEAM", and that multiple names were being considered—including simply "Max". The service is expected to be revealed in an event on April 12, 2023. In February 2023, Zaslav stated that WBD no longer planned to shut down Discovery+, stating that it was profitable, and that its subscribers were "very happy with the product offering".

Management
HBO Max was formed under WarnerMedia's Entertainment division, then headed by Robert Greenblatt. Kevin Reilly, president of WarnerMedia Entertainment Networks, which includes most of the company's ad-supported entertainment channels such as TBS, TNT, and TruTV, was also given the role of as chief content officer of HBO Max with responsibility for HBO Max-exclusive original programming and library content. Andy Forssell was named the service's executive vice president and general manager while still reporting to Otter Media CEO Tony Goncalves, who leads development. Casey Bloys, programming president of HBO, retained oversight of the core HBO service but was not initially involved with Max-exclusive programming.

On August 7, 2020, WarnerMedia announced a significant restructuring under new president Jason Kilar, which he described as "leaning into this great moment of change" towards direct-to-consumer services. As a result, Greenblatt and Reilly both left the company. WarnerMedia Entertainment was dissolved, with programming operations combined with Warner Bros. in a new Studios and Networks group under that studio's CEO Ann Sarnoff. Bloys was given complete programming oversight of HBO and HBO Max, as well as Reilly's other previous responsibilities, reporting to Sarnoff. Forssell became the head of a new HBO Max operating business unit, reporting directly to Kilar. On April 23, 2021, Adult Swim and HBO Max's adult animation development teams merged under the leadership of Suzanna Makkos.

On August 15, 2022, HBO was reorganized by Warner Bros. Discovery, resulting in layoffs within HBO Max's non-scripted originals, live-action family originals, international originals, and casting units (HBO itself never had an in-house casting department). Makkos also began reporting to HBO's head of comedy Amy Gravitt.

Programming
HBO Max features first-run and library content from the namesake HBO and other Warner Bros. film and television studios and brands. The service also includes films available through HBO's existing pay television rights that are sourced from Warner Bros. Pictures and third-party studios, such as Summit Entertainment, Universal Pictures, and 20th Century Studios (the latter three have respective output deals with HBO until 2022).

As with HBO's other streaming platforms, HBO Go and HBO Now (but as opposed to its platforms on Apple TV Channels and Amazon Video Channels), HBO Max does not include feeds of HBO's linear cable channels, nor any content from Cinemax. Though Cinemax shares its film content with the linear HBO channel, and therefore the majority of films in the combined library will be on both services in different windows, these films will not necessarily be available on both HBO Max and Cinemax at the same time.

Content providers 
First and third-party content providers for HBO Max. Asterisk (*) denotes third parties while cross (†) denotes former providers.

 Adult Swim
 All3Media
 Bad Robot Productions*
 Boomerang
 Cartoon Network
 Cartoonito
 Mattel Television* (Americas and Europe only)
 Sesame Workshop* (Americas only.)
 CNN
 Comedy Central*
 The Criterion Collection*
 Crunchyroll* †
 The CW
 DC Entertainment
 GKIDS*
 HBO
 Hello Sunshine*
 HLN
 New Line Cinema
 Rooster Teeth
 Sky*
 Sony Pictures* (Central and Eastern Europe only)
 Studio Ghibli* (through GKIDS)
 TBS
 TNT
 TruTV
 Turner Classic Movies
 Turner Entertainment Co.
 TV Globo* (Latin America and the Caribbean only, except Brazil)
 Warner Bros. (except Warner Bros. Japan and Taiwan content, which currently releases through Netflix and Disney+)

Max Originals
 
Original content produced will be under the banner Max Originals, including series, films, and specials. Original episodic content is released weekly, eschewing the "binge" format made popular by Netflix. Kevin Reilly stated this was to ensure that originals would remain in the spotlight for extended periods, by letting said shows "breathe" as opposed to "fading quickly after a binge and burn". He also noted that the weekly schedule helped to drive the success of past HBO shows like Succession and Chernobyl which they co-produced with Sky UK, and became hits precisely due to their staying power.

A slate of 31 original series were planned for its first year, with plans to expand to 50 for its next year, but production timelines may have been interrupted by the COVID-19 pandemic. HBO Max also has podcasts about the films and TV series on the service. It also produces original podcasts exclusively for HBO Max, with Batman: The Audio Adventures being the first.

Syndication
New Warner Bros. Television Studios-produced series that have premiered on The CW since the 2019–20 season beginning with Batwoman, Nancy Drew and Katy Keene (which was cancelled in July 2020) will have their past seasons placed on HBO Max about a month after the season finale airs on television (streaming rights to existing series remains with Netflix under an existing deal). Although the All American spin-off, All American: Homecoming, which premiered on the CW in 2022, was placed on Netflix with its parent show. On July 9, 2019, HBO Max acquired the U.S. streaming rights to Friends in a $425 million deal, and on September 17, 2019, acquired the U.S. streaming rights to The Big Bang Theory, as part of a deal that also extends TBS's off-network rights to the series through 2028.

Acquired rights
Outside of WarnerMedia, the service also offers titles from The Criterion Collection, and has a long-term partnership with BBC Studios (which HBO had previously partnered with to create His Dark Materials). Over 700 episodes of BBC content were available on the service at launch, including the first 11 seasons of the 2005 Doctor Who revival, as well as future seasons twelve through fourteen, and a variety of other shows including The Honourable Woman, Luther, Top Gear, and the original British version of The Office. Additionally, future shows by BBC Studios will be co-produced with HBO Max.

HBO also extended their existing partnership with Sesame Workshop, while moving said content to the front of the HBO Max brand. Select episodes from all fifty seasons of Sesame Street (dating back to 1969) are available to stream on the service for the first time ever. Additionally, future seasons of Sesame Street will stream exclusively on HBO Max, alongside Esme & Roy, and several new spin-offs starting with The Not-Too-Late Show with Elmo, Sesame Street: Mecha Builders, and The Monster at the End of This Story. On March 8, 2022, WarnerMedia and Sesame Workshop announced they will plan new shows for Cartoon Network for the new original series run and a second run acquisition rights HBO Max, including Charlotte's Web, and Bea's Block as well as the animation special Sesame Street: The Nutcracker. In addition, new episodes to start of the 53rd season of Sesame Street and spin-offs will be available to stream on HBO Max in selecting Asian territories while holding the second run acquisition rights to replace PBS, more than a new first run for Cartoon Network.

HBO Max has acquired the streaming rights to several Comedy Central series, including South Park, Awkwafina Is Nora from Queens, South Side, and The Other Two; with the latter two becoming Max Original series.

In November 2021, HBO Max acquired the rights to Globo's telenovelas and series for Latin America and the Caribbean outside of Brazil.

In February 2022, Sony Pictures and WarnerMedia announced that they will extend their agreement to carry films from its subsidiary companies in its Central and Eastern Europe pay television window rights window along with the library of television series produced by its sister company Sony Pictures Television Studios, the deal will also include the rights to its releases beginning in 2022 for broadcasting on its channels and will be streaming it on HBO Max throughout Central and Eastern Europe.

Animation
The service also features many hubs for animated programming, drawing largely from the libraries of Warner Bros. Animation (including the Looney Tunes franchise and Hanna-Barbera productions, such as Scooby-Doo, Tom and Jerry and Tex Avery's cartoons as well) and Cartoon Network, along with Adult Swim. Original animated series (including the Adventure Time epilogue specials Adventure Time: Distant Lands, Jellystone!, Looney Tunes Cartoons, continuations of Infinity Train and Summer Camp Island, and a reboot of The Boondocks produced by Sony Pictures Animation) for both network sections were also announced for HBO Max, and the service beat out competitors to acquire exclusive domestic streaming rights to South Park and its next three seasons for $500 million–with first-run episodes being added 24 hours after their premiere on Comedy Central. Fellow Otter Media company Rooster Teeth also contributes content, with season two of Gen:Lock to be a timed exclusive for HBO Max.

Post-launch
All eight films in the Harry Potter series were available to stream on the service on launch day, despite earlier reports indicating that the films, although produced by Warner Bros., would not be available due to a prior broadcast rights agreement with NBCUniversal. It was later announced that the films would be removed on August 25 and made available on NBCUniversal's streaming service Peacock. However, it officially brought them back on September 1, 2021, after an adjustment in the agreement. On May 29, 2020, HBO Max acquired the exclusive streaming rights to The Big Bang Theory spin-off Young Sheldon.

On June 9, 2020, Gone with the Wind was temporarily removed from HBO Max's library amid the George Floyd protests, following an op-ed in the Los Angeles Times by 12 Years a Slave screenwriter John Ridley. On June 25, the film returned in its original form with, as suggested by Ridley, a new introduction by Turner Classic Movies host Jacqueline Stewart discussing the film's treatments of the American Civil War, the Reconstruction era, and American slavery of African people.

On June 27, 2020, it was revealed that DC Universe original Harley Quinn will stream its first two seasons on HBO Max. On June 29, 2020, HBO Max secured the exclusive streaming rights of the Oprah Winfrey Network series David Makes Man. On September 18, 2020, it was announced that all DC Universe content would be migrating to HBO Max, including original shows like Titans and Young Justice, which will have their newest seasons air exclusively on the service. In addition, both Doom Patrol and Harley Quinn have been renewed for third seasons exclusively for the service.

On October 28, 2020, it was announced that the 1990s series Tiny Toon Adventures would be rebooted for Cartoon Network and HBO Max as Tiny Toons Looniversity, featuring older versions of the characters. Steven Spielberg is expected to return as executive producer. The show was given a two-season order.

In February 2021, it was announced that WarnerMedia's international preschool brand Cartoonito would launch in the United States via Cartoon Network and HBO Max later in the year, with a slate of 50 series by 2023.

In renewing his contract with WarnerMedia, Conan O'Brien announced plans to move to a weekly variety format on HBO Max from his nightly TBS show, ending a 28-year run on late-night television between NBC and TBS in June 2021.

In August 2021, Funimation, a subsidiary of Sony, purchased Crunchyroll from AT&T for $1.175 billion, with the intent to create a combined service that caters to anime entertainment. On January 1, 2022, HBO Max removed the Crunchyroll hub, instead redirecting subscribers to a "global animation" page that combines selected anime with other international animated films. Since then, the service has slowly started to remove anime from Crunchyroll's line up.

On November 22, 2021, Disney and WarnerMedia reached a deal to amend the pre-existing contract HBO had with 20th Century Studios to allow Disney+ or Hulu and HBO Max to share the streaming rights to half of 20th Century Studios' and Searchlight Pictures' 2022 theatrical slate in the United States during the pay-one window, with Ron's Gone Wrong being the first film under the deal, becoming available on both Disney+ and HBO Max on December 15, 2021. Disney will still have full streaming rights to any 20th Century Studios and Searchlight Pictures films produced for Disney+ or Hulu, while the Disney deal with WarnerMedia for streaming 20th Century Studios and Searchlight Pictures films on HBO Max will end in 2022, with Disney+ and Hulu assuming the full pay-one rights to those films in the future.

On February 15, 2022, it was announced that first-run episodes of South Park would move to Paramount+ beginning with season 27 in 2024, and the series library would move from HBO Max to the service in the United States in 2025.

On August 4, 2022, it was announced that selected Magnolia Network programs would become available on HBO Max in September 2022. Discovery+ will remain the main streaming home of its programming.

On October 7, 2022, it was announced that the HBO Max original series Harley Quinn will have a Valentine's Day Special titled "Harley Quinn: A Very Problematic Valentine’s Day Special" on February 23, 2023.

"": Warner Bros. same-day premieres
In late 2020, due to the COVID-19 pandemic, WarnerMedia moved two Warner Bros. films originally intended as major theatrical releases to either exclusive or simultaneous releases on HBO Max. The Witches was released exclusively on HBO Max in the U.S. on October 22, and Wonder Woman 1984 debuted simultaneously in North American theaters and on HBO Max on December 25, although the latter was initially only available on the service for a month. Week-long free trials were discontinued in December 2020.

On December 3, 2020, it was announced that the studio's entire 2021 film lineup would see a simultaneous theatrical release and a one-month limited release on the streaming service, starting with The Little Things on January 29. Subsequent films released under the same-day theatrical/streaming window to date were Judas and the Black Messiah (February 12), Tom and Jerry (February 26), Godzilla vs. Kong (March 31), Mortal Kombat (April 23), Those Who Wish Me Dead (May 14), The Conjuring: The Devil Made Me Do It (June 4), In the Heights (June 10), Space Jam: A New Legacy (July 16), The Suicide Squad (August 5), Reminiscence (August 20), Malignant (September 10), Cry Macho (September 17), The Many Saints of Newark (October 1), Dune (October 22), King Richard (November 19), and The Matrix Resurrections (December 22). Standard release windows applied to each film after their initial limited-run streaming release on the service; HBO Max would then reassume streaming rights to the aforementioned Warner Bros. films upon their respective pay television premieres on the linear HBO service in mid-to-late 2021 or 2022, depending on the scheduled start of their individual HBO exhibition agreements.

This decision, called "Project Popcorn" within Warner Bros., was met with backlash from filmmakers, production companies, the Directors Guild of America, the Creative Artists Agency, and movie theater owners as Warner Bros. had not informed anyone about their plan ahead of the announcement. Viewership of the films varied, with Mortal Kombat reaching 3.8 million, The Conjuring: The Devil Made Me Do It totaling 1.6 million, and In the Heights totaling 693,000 (according to Samba TV, as WarnerMedia does not report viewership numbers for HBO Max).

Warner Bros. spent over $200million alone compensating talent for the shift to streaming; Deadline reported in January 2022 that such a business move "will never occur again given its high cost".

In March 2021, it was announced that Warner Bros. would discontinue same-day releases in 2022, as part of an agreement the studio reached with Cineworld (who operates Regal Cinemas) and will instead use a 45-day exclusive release window for theaters. The Matrix Resurrections was the final film released in 2021 as part of Project Popcorn. The 45-day release window for HBO Max was only used for two films (The Batman and Fantastic Beasts: The Secrets of Dumbledore) before it was reported in August 2022 that as part of a restructuring of Warner Bros' film distribution strategy following the merger of WarnerMedia and Discovery, Inc, the length of the window would now be decided for each film on a case-by-case basis.

Sports 
AT&T chairman and CEO Randall L. Stephenson did not rule out adding live sporting events from Turner Sports to HBO Max in the future.

 Turner Sports' broadcast rights to the National Hockey League as of the 2021–22 season includes an option for HBO Max to hold over-the-top streaming rights, including simulcasts of games aired on TNT, and games exclusive to the service. WarnerMedia executives stated upon the announcement of the contract that they were still exploring options for these rights.
 On March 1, 2022, Turner Sports announced an eight-year deal to hold rights to United States men's and women's national soccer team home matches, such as FIFA World Cup qualifying and international friendlies. This excludes FIFA and CONCACAF events, whose rights are held by Fox, and away matches, whose rights are held by whoever holds the rights to the home team's matches. It was stated that at least half the matches per-season will be exclusive to HBO Max.

Technologies and accessibility 
At launch, HBO Max did not support 4K, HDR, Dolby Vision, or Dolby Atmos, but support for these technologies were planned as "part of the HBO Max product roadmap". Support for 4K, HDR, and Atmos was added starting with the release of Wonder Woman 1984, with WarnerMedia promising to add more content in these formats throughout 2021 and beyond.

The service provided closed captioning support at launch, but initially lacked support for audio description (AD) for those with visual impairments. In October 2020, the American Council of the Blind announced it had reached a settlement with WarnerMedia whereby at least 1,500 hours of HBO Max content will be available with AD by the end of March 2021, increasing to at least 6,000 hours by March 2023, along with other accessibility enhancements to the website and apps by September 2021. HBO Max later began rolling out AD on select titles on March 26, 2021.

Distribution

United States 
The majority of active subscribers to the HBO pay TV service (which previously included HBO Go), and most customers that were subscribed to HBO Now at time of launch, can access HBO Max for no extra charge, with all three services generally sharing the same price point of $14.99 per month. However, this transition is contingent on the customer's current provider or biller having signed a new distribution agreement for HBO Max with WarnerMedia.

On May 27, 2020, as part of an agreement with Time Warner that renewed its carriage contract for the Turner Broadcasting System networks and gave its over-the-top television service Sling TV distribution rights to the linear HBO channel, Dish Network secured an option to become a distribution partner for HBO Max following the exclusivity period with Apple. HBO content is also available as a premium add-on for DirecTV Stream and Hulu for the same $14.99 price as HBO Max.

In announcing HBO Max, WarnerMedia immediately confirmed that HBO subscribers on AT&T-owned platforms (including AT&T TV, DirecTV, U-verse, and AT&T Mobility) will receive HBO Max on-launch at no additional charge. AT&T customers who are subscribed to their highest-tiered internet, TV and wireless plans will also receive HBO Max for free, while those on lower-tiered plans will get a free trial ranging from one month to one year. Existing HBO Now subscribers billed directly by HBO were also migrated to HBO Max on-launch at no additional charge. On April 27, 2020, an agreement was announced for HBO Now subscribers via Apple (both in-app subscriptions and Apple TV Channels) to be migrated to HBO Max. Content from HBO Max will be listed in the Apple TV app along with there being a dedicated HBO Max hub in the app. On Apple TV devices, HBO Max is available to the regular fourth generation Apple TV and fifth and sixth generation Apple TV 4K; earlier versions which do not support third-party app download are not supported.
 
At launch, HBO Max was only available to customers in the United States and certain territories of the same country. Due to regional rights restrictions, HBO cannot offer the service outside of the country, and its terms of use explicitly forbid the service from being used outside the United States. Users from outside the U.S. that are detected to have used services such as virtual private networks (VPN) to evade the geo-blocking to use HBO Max are subject to have their services terminated with no refund.

WarnerMedia subsequently negotiated with other pay TV providers for similar arrangements. On February 20, 2020, WarnerMedia announced a distribution deal with YouTube TV that would allow members to add HBO and Cinemax, while also being able to include HBO Max as an add-on. On April 15, 2020, WarnerMedia announced a similar deal with Charter Spectrum (which acquired Warner's former cable division after it was spun off in 2009, in May 2016) to give access to HBO Max for HBO subscribers via their TV Everywhere credentials. A similar agreement was announced with Hulu on May 1 for most existing subscribers via Hulu + Live TV, as well as being available as an add-on to all other plans on the service. On May 20, 2020, it was announced that WarnerMedia had made distribution deals with Altice USA, Cox Communications, Xbox, Samsung, PlayStation, Verizon Communications and the National Cable Television Cooperative (NCTC). An agreement with Comcast (Xfinity) was announced a few hours after the platform's launch. HBO Max is also available on Xfinity Flex and Cox Contour Stream Player.

The most prominent platforms without agreements to carry HBO Max at the launch were Amazon (maker of the Fire TV and Fire HD devices) and Roku, which together are estimated to control 70% of the U.S. streaming player market. With both platforms, non-Max HBO content remained available as usual through the companies' respective channels platforms and/or through HBO Now (which was rebranded to just "HBO" on July 31, 2020) while deals for HBO Max were being worked out. On May 13, 2020, John Stankey, CEO of AT&T, revealed to Variety that Amazon was very unlikely to become a launch partner for HBO Max; the parties have remained at an impasse following the launch, reportedly due to a disagreement about whether Amazon can host the additional Max programming directly on its Amazon Prime Video Channels platform as it does for HBO currently. On November 16, 2020, it was announced that WarnerMedia and Amazon had reached an agreement to make HBO Max available on Fire TV and Fire Tablet devices beginning the following day, while also allowing subscribers of HBO via Prime Video Channels access to the HBO Max app at no extra cost (although the additional Max programming will still not be hosted on the Prime Video Channels platform). The dispute with Roku was reported to hinge on carriage commissions and advertising sales on the future ad-supported tier. On December 16, 2020, it was announced that WarnerMedia and Roku had reached an agreement to make HBO Max available on Roku devices beginning the following day, while also allowing subscribers of HBO via Roku Channels access to the HBO Max app at no extra cost (although the additional Max programming will still not be hosted on the Roku Channels platform); conversely, Roku remote controls from the past five years which included an HBO Now app shortcut button now route viewers directly to the HBO Max app instead. Dish Network was also erroneously mentioned as a holdout in some media reports; HBO has not been available at all from Dish since late 2018 due to a separate dispute. On July 29, 2021, WarnerMedia and Dish announced that they had reached an agreement to resolve the dispute and restore HBO to Dish's satellite service, along with offering access to HBO Max to HBO subscribers via Dish at no extra cost.

There were plans for HBO Max to introduce an ad-supported tier by 2021, with AT&T later announcing during their Investor Day event on March 12, 2021, that the tier would launch in June of the same year. HBO original programming will continue to be ad-free for subscribers of the tier, but the tier will not allow access to Same-Day Premieres. WarnerMedia later announced during their 2021 upfront presentation on May 19 that the ad-supported tier would launch during the first week of June at a price point of $9.99 a month. The tier would end up launching on June 3, while also adding a yearly option for both tiers (priced at $99.99 a year for the ad-supported tier and $149.99 a year for the ad-free tier).

International expansion 

Localized versions of HBO Max launched on June 29, 2021, in Latin America and the Caribbean, on October 26, 2021, in Andorra, Spain and the Nordics (excluding Iceland), and on March 8, 2022, in Central & Eastern Europe and Portugal, in part by converting existing streaming services operated by HBO in some of those markets to the HBO Max platform. In the interim, some HBO Max original programs have been made available on WarnerMedia's existing international platforms, also including HBO Asia.

In other countries, HBO and/or HBO Max original programs are licensed to third-party networks and streaming services under long-term deals. In these cases, HBO Max has left it up to individual rightsholders to decide whether to offer its programming on an over-the-top basis. The extent and lengths of the deals vary by country; not all networks that carry HBO programs also carry HBO Max programs, and in some cases individual programs are carried by different services.

WarnerMedia said in late 2019 that it planned to continue HBO's existing international licensing partnerships for the time being. However, as part of the WarnerMedia further restructuring announced in August 2020, WarnerMedia president Jason Kilar said HBO Max would be expanding its scope globally. Operations chief Andy Forssell indicated later that year that the company ultimately plans to have HBO Max active in 190 countries, but that a timeline for most of the remaining countries had not been decided.

Following the merger of WarnerMedia with Discovery, Inc. in April 2022, Warner Bros. Discovery has decided to instead halt international expansion of HBO Max, and instead continuing to license its content to other international distributors such as Sky Europe and Foxtel in markets where HBO Max isn't available, in an attempt to reach financial stability for the company.

Latin America and the Caribbean 
HBO Max was launched on June 29, 2021, in the 39 territories of Latin America and the Caribbean, where HBO already operated directly its streaming service HBO Go, and premium television channels.

Canada 
Before the launch of HBO Max, Canadian rights to HBO-owned-and-distributed programming were held by Bell Media, the mass-media unit of telecom company Bell Canada. 
Programming is offered through the hybrid Crave pay television and streaming service, which includes an HBO-branded multiplex channel that launched in 2008, and Bell's French-language pay service Super Écran.

In 2019, Bell Media announced an expanded partnership with WarnerMedia for the rights to scripted programming produced by Warner Bros. and its affiliates for HBO Max. The deal does not include the rights to series produced for the service by third-party studios. In addition, several youth and family-oriented shows produced for HBO Max were acquired by rival broadcaster Corus Entertainment for their specialty channels.

As of August 2022, the merger of HBO Max and Discovery+ is not planned to release in Canada. Bell Media has also stated it does not plan to change its deal for rights to programming for HBO Max.

Europe

United Kingdom, Ireland, Germany, Switzerland, Austria and Italy 
Under a long-term agreement until 2024 between HBO and Sky Group (Comcast), Sky operates Sky Atlantic which broadcasts the majority of HBO's programming. Sky Atlantic is available in the UK, Ireland, Germany, Switzerland, Austria, and Italy. In February 2011, Sky Atlantic launched on the Sky platforms in the United Kingdom and Ireland, which maintains a distribution deal with HBO to offer the majority of its programming on the channel. Under the five-year agreement between HBO and Sky, newer HBO programs will air on Sky Atlantic before airing on other television channels within the United Kingdom and Ireland. Before 2011, TG4 in Ireland had a long-term agreement to broadcast HBO programming free-to-air, this ceased following the creation of Sky Atlantic. In many other countries, HBO Max has licensed exclusive rights to its programming to television networks owned by third parties, including Sky Atlantic in the United Kingdom. In March 2021, WarnerMedia confirmed that HBO Max would not launch in the UK, Ireland, Germany, Switzerland, Austria, and Italy before 2025 due to an existing deal for HBO programming with Sky Group which was renewed in 2019 but does not automatically include HBO Max programs produced by third-party companies or Warner Bros.

Nordic countries and Spain 
On August 15, 2012, HBO announced plans to launch HBO Nordic, a multiplatform video distribution service serving Norway, Denmark, Sweden and Finland that was created through a joint venture with Parsifal International. The video on demand service launched in December 2012. HBO programming also airs in Iceland on Stöð 2.
In Spain, HBO programs were previously broadcast on pay television service Canal+, since 2011. In 2016, during the discontinuation of the Canal+ branding in Spain, HBO launched a standalone streaming service called HBO España, which is the Spanish equivalent of HBO Now and HBO Nordic.
HBO Europe had announced on multiple occasions that they were not aware that they were going to replace their current service with HBO Max, nor would their rates be increased. However, in December 2020, the head of HBO Max, Andy Forssell, revealed that all HBO services in Europe, including HBO España and HBO Nordic, will be replaced by HBO Max. On October 26, 2021, HBO Max was launched in the Nordics (excluding Iceland) and Spain and Andorra.

Central and Eastern Europe countries and Portugal 
In the 2010s HBO Europe launched streaming service HBO Go in 13 Central and Eastern European countries. HBO programs in Portugal were previously broadcast on the premium television channel TVSéries from the services of TVCine, since 2015. In 2019, less than a year before the discontinuation of TVSeries, HBO Europe launched a standalone streaming service called HBO Portugal. Similarly to the Nordics and Spain, HBO Max was launched in Portugal and Central and Eastern Europe on March 8, 2022, replacing HBO Portugal and HBO Go.

Plans to also introduce HBO Max in certain Eastern European countries where HBO Go was absent, such as Turkey and Greece were announced on October 2021, but these plans were later halted, with Vodafone TV in Greece and various TV operators in Turkey, including Digiturk, instead getting the rights for various HBO and HBO Max programming.

France 
On November 13, 2008, Orange launched Orange Cinéma Séries (renamed OCS in 2012), a five-channel package, dedicated to movie and series. The same year, OCS signed a long-term agreement with HBO. On October 10, 2013, they launched the channel OCS City (initially nicknamed Génération HBO) to broadcast only HBO productions. The HBO catalog is also available to stream on their streaming service. Since 2019, OCS has the complete exclusivity on the HBO catalog in France. Before that, other channels like Canal+, Canal+ Séries or NT1 could aired reruns of selected HBO series after their original run on OCS. However, OCS do not have the rights on the HBO Max catalogue. The deal ended in December 2022, with HBO productions leaving OCS from January 2023 onwards.

In October 2021, former Canal+ executive Vera Peltekian was appointed as VP and commissioning editor of original HBO Max programming for France. HBO Max launch in France was set for 2023, but was cancelled after the Warner Bros. Discovery merge which stopped the global rollout of HBO Max in order to launch later the combined platform with Discovery+. Meanwhile, Canal+, the TF1 Group, and Warner TV broadcast a selection of the Warner Bros.-produced scripted live-action Max Original series, certain films and reunion specials. Programs not owned by Warner Bros. (like Lionsgate's Love Life) have been licensed separately to other French broadcasters. In October 2022, Amazon Prime Video signed a deal with Warner Bros. Discovery to distribute the HBO Max programs owned by Warner Bros. in France. In January 2023, it was announced that the deal was extended to all HBO productions, following the expiration of the deals with OCS for HBO productions and with Canal+ for carriage of Warner Bros. Discovery's TV channels in France, with the launch of "Le Pass Warner" (literally "Warner's Pass"), a subscription-based channel. Selected programs (like The Last of Us and Peacemaker) will be given a release without a subscription to the channel.

Netherlands 
On February 9, 2012, HBO Netherlands started as a joint venture between HBO and Dutch cable operator Ziggo. HBO Netherlands aired as a three-channel multiplex service in addition to offering a localized version of HBO Go to subscribers. HBO Netherlands was not limited to subscribers of Ziggo, instead, many Dutch cable operators offered HBO Netherlands. However, on September 28, 2016, HBO Netherlands announced that it would cease operations on December 31, 2016. That same day, it was announced that Ziggo had bought exclusive rights to HBO programming. On November 1, 2016, it was announced that Ziggo will offer HBO programming exclusively as part of their new Movies & Series service starting from January 2017. In September 2021, it was reported that Ziggo's rights to HBO programming is set to expire at the end of the year. Ziggo confirmed that its HBO programming rights are set to expire on January 1, 2022, as a result of WarnerMedia launching HBO Max in The Netherlands in 2022. However, some recently aired seasons will remain on the Movies & Series service.

On February 1, 2022, the launch date was officially announced for March 8, 2022.

Australia and New Zealand 
Fox Showcase, an Australian premium television service, began airing HBO original programming in 2012, through a licensed distribution arrangement with subscription television provider Foxtel. Before this, limited HBO content was broadcast through the now-defunct Movie Network, which was founded by HBO (through Time Warner), Village Roadshow, Metro-Goldwyn-Mayer and Disney–ABC International Television. HBO Originals are also available on-demand via Foxtel services Foxtel Now and Binge. Sky Movies in New Zealand originally operated as a joint venture between HBO and Sky Network Television. The channel was renamed HBO in 1993; Time Warner later sold its share in the service to Sky in 1998, and it was renamed back to Sky Movies. HBO programming is currently shown by Sky channel SoHo, and its subscription streaming service Neon, in New Zealand. Deals with some other partners including Foxtel in Australia and Sky in New Zealand which includes a significant portion of HBO Max's original programming were agreed or renewed between 2019 and 2021. Foxtel and Warner Bros Discovery renewed their partnership in February 2023, making HBO and Warner Bros. content available across Foxtel's pay-TV channels as well as its Foxtel Now and Binge streaming services. However, in a press release, Warner Bros. Discovery President and Managing Director for Western Pacific, James Gibbons, said the renewed deal with Foxtel "also provides optionality for future collaboration, including for our future streaming service", perhaps hinting at plans to launch HBO Max (or the successors which encompass all WBD properties which would feature all of the content of HBO Max and most, but not all, of the content of Discovery+) in Australia in the future.

Asia-Pacific

Southeast Asia, India, Hong Kong and Taiwan 
In June 2021, WarnerMedia appointed a managing director for the launch of HBO Max in eight territories across Southeast Asia and the exploration of the possibilities to launch HBO Max in the Indian market.

Warner Bros. Discovery India decided to premiere their HBO Max original programming, including their original films, on Amazon Prime Video, and on Disney+ Hotstar due to a previously established deal in 2016.

The plans to launch HBO Max in Southeast Asia were later halted.

Japan 
In Japan,  reached a deal to carry HBO and HBO Max original programs in Japan beginning on April 1, 2021. This replaced a previous deal between HBO and Amazon Prime Video Japan. This deal between Warner Bros. Discovery and U-Next was renewed in March 2023, making the streaming service the home of HBO content in the country in a "multi-year" deal between the two.

Middle East and North Africa 
OSN currently carries HBO content across 22 countries in the Middle East and North Africa region on its linear channels as well as its OSN+ streaming service. An exclusive, multi-year licensing deal was renewed in March 2023, meaning an HBO Max launch is unlikely in this region in the near future.

Launch

Reception
HBO Max received mixed reception from media observers on launch. The range of available content was generally well received, but many commented on the likelihood of confusion with HBO's other since-deprecated streaming platforms, HBO Go and HBO Now, and the service's higher subscription price compared to other newly launched streaming platforms like Disney+. Television critics also expressed frustration that the library of original series (not including its former late night adult content) for sister network Cinemax was not originally available on HBO Max, though much of its output had arrived on the service by the end of 2021.

AT&T announced in July 2020 that HBO Max had nominally achieved 26.6 million subscribers after its first month of operation, including 23.6 million wholesale customers, primarily legacy HBO pay TV subscribers that were covered by new agreements that added access to HBO Max at no extra charge. However, only 4.1 million customers had activated their HBO Max accounts by the same date. The latter figure was seen by many observers as a disappointment, particularly in light of Disney+ having reached 10 million subscribers within a day of launch; The New York Times's media critic Ben Smith wrote that WarnerMedia had "badly botched" the launch.

However, AT&T executives contended that it had been a "flawless launch" citing increased customer engagement compared to HBO Now and overall growth in total subscriptions to either HBO or HBO Max (36.3 million, vs. 34.6 million HBO or HBO Now subscribers at the end of 2019), while acknowledging that there was more to do to persuade existing HBO subscribers to start using the HBO Max apps. Executives had previously noted that HBO Max was starting from a different place than other streaming services as it was building on the existing HBO subscriber base, and had to work within the constraints of many of HBO's pre-existing deals (such as those with Amazon and Roku).

In October 2020, AT&T revealed that the number of activated HBO Max subscribers had reached 8.6 million by the end of September, while the number of nominal (eligible) subscribers reached 28.7 million. The total number of HBO / HBO Max subscriptions in the U.S. also increased to 28 million. With an agreement being reached the following month with Amazon (which is reported to have had 5 million HBO subscribers through Prime Video Channels), the number of HBO Max-eligible subscribers is understood to have increased to over 33 million. In September 2022, Warner Bros. Discovery was sued by a shareholder, alleging that WarnerMedia had overstated the number of HBO Max subscribers by including unactivated subscriptions bundled with AT&T services.

See also
 List of streaming media services

Footnotes

References

External links
 

 
Internet television streaming services
Subscription video on demand services
2020 establishments in the United States
Internet properties established in 2020
Android (operating system) software
IOS software
PlayStation 4 software
PlayStation 5 software
Xbox One software
Xbox Series X and Series S software